The Mateh Asher Regional Council (Mo'atza Azorit Mateh Asher) is a regional council in the western Galilee of northern Israel. It is named after the Tribe of Asher which had been allotted the region in antiquity according to the Book of Joshua (19:24–31). It was founded in 1982 as a merger of three regional councils: Ga'aton, Na'aman and Sulam Tzor. The council's offices are located on Highway 4, between Regba and Lohamei HaGeta'ot.

The regional council was established in 1982, now stretches over 216,059 dunams and includes some 17,300 residents. As of 2008, the head of the regional council is Yehuda Shavit, and the chief rabbi is Rabbi Shlomo Ben Eliyahu.

List of settlements
This regional council provides municipal services for the populations within its territory, who live in various types of communities including kibbutzim and moshavim, Arab villages, and community and other settlements:

Kibbutzim

Adamit
Afek
Beit HaEmek
Eilon
Ein HaMifratz

Evron
Ga'aton
Gesher HaZiv
Hanita
Kabri

Kfar Masaryk
Lohamei HaGeta'ot
Matzuba
Rosh HaNikra
Sa'ar

Shomrat
Yehiam
Yas'ur

Moshavim

Ahihud
Amka
Ben Ami

Bustan HaGalil
Betzet

Liman
Netiv HaShayara

Regba
Shavei Tzion

Community settlements and villages
Klil
Nes Ammim
Oshrat

Arab villages
Arab al-Aramshe 
Sheikh Danun

International relations 
Mateh Asher is twin towns with following cities and districts:

 : Oldenburg, since 1996

References

External links
 Official website (Hebrew) 

 
Regional councils in Northern District (Israel)